Frank Harris (July 18, 1943 – April 27, 2020) was an American film director, producer, and cinematographer who has been working in films since the late 1970s. His work as a director includes Killpoint in 1984, Low Blow and The Patriot in 1986, If We Knew Then in 1987 and Lockdown in 1990. He originally worked as a television reporter.

Background
His wife Canadian born Diane Stevenett (married 1980), has also appeared in a number of his films.

Before entering the film industry, Harris worked as a reporter for a California television station.

Career
He began his career around 1976 or 1978 as a cinematographer with Enforcer from Death Row aka Ninja Assassins, a film that featured Leo Fong, Darnell Garcia, John Hammond, Cameron Mitchell, Ann Farber and Booker T. Anderson. He then applied his cinematography skills to the film Goldrunner, a film about a kidnapped child, which starred Richard Losee and Kristin Kelly. Harris also had an acting role in the film as the mechanic. He took on multiple tasks in the 1984 film, Killpoint. He was the film's director, producer, screenwriter and cinematographer.

Director
Killpoint, a 1984 film that starred Leo Fong, Hope Holiday, Cameron Mitchell, Stack Pierce and Richard Rountree, Diane Stevenett was his directorial debut.  It also featured James Lew and Bill Wallace. In 1986 he directed Low Blow, another Leo Fong Film that featured Billy Blanks and Akosua Busia, early 1960s heartthrob Troy Donahue and Stack Pierce.  This film gave Blanks his first credited film role. Also in 1986 he directed  The Patriot, a film about a disgraced navy seal that goes after terrorists that steal nuclear missiles. It starred Gregg Henry, Simone Griffeth, Jeff Conaway, Leslie Nielsen and Stack Pierce. 1990 he directed Aftershock, a Sci-Fi film set in Set in a post-apocalyptic 21st Century. It starred Elizabeth Kaitan, Chuck Jeffreys, James Lew, Richard Lynch, Christopher Mitchum, John Saxon and Michael Standing

Cinematographer
As a cinematographer, Harris's early work was with Leo Fong in Enforcer from Death Row which starred Cameron Mitchell, Leo Fong, Booker T. Anderson, and Darnell Garcia. 
In the 1980s, he worked on the Joel Silberg directed Catch the Heat,  an action film about a female agent / martial expert operating in Argentina. It was released in 1987. Harris was back working with Leo Fong in Showdown. The 1993 film which also starred Richard Lynch and Werner Hoetzinger was about a town of Mafia retirees that have their sanctuary invaded by a motorcycle gang. 
Harris worked on the 2009 television series Kamen Rider: Dragon Knight. Already a seasoned veteran, he was in charge of the camera crew.

Filmography

Feature films

Television

References

External links
 

20th-century births
2020 deaths
American film directors
American film producers
American cinematographers
Year of birth missing
Place of birth missing